Texas Bad Man is a 1953 American Western film directed by Lewis D. Collins and starring Wayne Morris, Frank Ferguson and Elaine Riley.

Plot

Cast
Wayne Morris as Walt
Frank Ferguson as Gil
Elaine Riley as Lois
Sheb Wooley as Mack
Denver Pyle as Tench
Myron Healey as Jackson
Mort Mills as bartender
Nelson Leigh as Bradley

References

External links

1953 Western (genre) films
American Western (genre) films
Films directed by Lewis D. Collins
Allied Artists films
Films scored by Raoul Kraushaar
American black-and-white films
Films with screenplays by Joseph F. Poland
1950s English-language films
1950s American films